The Senses, or Sense, were a Dacian tribe in the southern region of Dacia.

References

Tribes
Dacia